Colony Township may refer to the following townships in the United States:

 Colony Township, Adams County, Iowa
 Colony Township, Delaware County, Iowa
 Colony Township, Greeley County, Kansas
 Colony Township, Knox County, Missouri